
Gmina Lesznowola is a rural gmina (administrative district) in Piaseczno County, Masovian Voivodeship, in east-central Poland.

Villages
Gmina Lesznowola contains the villages and settlements of Garbatka, Jabłonowo, Janczewice, Jazgarzewszczyzna, Kolonia Lesznowola, Kolonia Mrokowska, Kosów, Łazy, Łazy Drugie, Leszczynka, Lesznowola, Łoziska, Magdalenka, Marysin, Mroków, Mysiadło, Nowa Iwiczna, Nowa Wola, Podolszyn, Stachowo, Stara Iwiczna, Stefanowo, Warszawianka, Wilcza Góra, Władysławów, Wola Mrokowska, Wólka Kosowska, Zamienie and Zgorzała.

Neighbouring gminas
Gmina Lesznowola is bordered by the city of Warsaw and by the gminas of Nadarzyn, Piaseczno, Raszyn and Tarczyn.

References
Polish official population figures 2006

Lesznowola
Piaseczno County